Khaled Kamar (born 2 February 1988), is an Egyptian footballer who plays for Egyptian Premier League side Tala'ea El Gaish as a forward.

Club career
On 15 June 2014, Kamar signed a three years contract with Zamalek.

International career
Kamar made his debut with the coach Shawky Ghareeb against Bosnia and Herzegovina on 5 March 2014.

International goals
''Scores and results list Egypt's goal tally first.

Honours

Club
Zamalek SC
Egyptian Premier League: 2014-15

References

External links
 
 

1988 births
Living people
People from Gharbia Governorate
Egyptian footballers
Association football forwards
Egypt international footballers
Egyptian Premier League players
Tanta SC players
Ittihad El Shorta SC players
Zamalek SC players
Smouha SC players
Al Ittihad Alexandria Club players
El Entag El Harby SC players